Bear Cove can mean a number of places (outports) in Newfoundland and Labrador:

 Bear Cove (1), Newfoundland and Labrador is a cove and neighbourhood of Rocky Harbour
 Bear Cove (2), Newfoundland and Labrador is a village in on Baie Verte Peninsula
 Bear Cove (3), Newfoundland and Labrador is a village near Anchor Point on the Strait of Belle Isle.
 Bear Cove (4), Newfoundland and Labrador was a hamlet near Twillingate in 1911.
 Bear Cove (5), Newfoundland and Labrador was a hamlet near Twillingate in 1911.
 Bear Cove (6), Newfoundland and Labrador was a small fishing settlement in the St. George area in 1911. It had a population of 18 in 1911.
 Bear Cove (7), Newfoundland and Labrador  was a small fishing settlement in the Ferryland area in 1911. It had a population of 12 in 1911.
 Bear Cove (8), Newfoundland and Labrador was in St. John's west.
 Bear Cove (9), Newfoundland and Labrador was a small place near LaPoile in 1864.

See also
 List of communities in Newfoundland and Labrador

Populated places in Newfoundland and Labrador